Carl Arvid von Klingspor (30 March 1829 – 15 June 1903) was a Swedish heraldist, genealogist and military personnel.

Klingspor was born in Säby, Södermanland.

Works
 "Svensk heraldik (1874; with Ernst Bernhard Schlegel)
 "Fortsättning av August Wilhelm Stiernstedts Sveriges ridderskaps och adels vapenbok" (1874–1879)
 "Den med sköldebref förlänade men ej å riddarhuset introducerade svenska adelns ättartaflor" (1875; with Ernst Bernhard Schlegel)
 "Upplands herregårdar" (1877–1881; with Ernst Bernhard Schlegel)
 "Om Uplands adel i äldre tider" (1880)
 "Baltisches Wappenbuch" (1882)
 "Sveriges ridderskaps och adels vapenbok" (1890)

References

1829 births
1903 deaths
19th-century Swedish historians
Writers from Södermanland
Barons of Sweden
Swedish genealogists
19th-century Swedish landowners
Carl Arvid